Pityrogramma sulphurea, the Jamaican goldback fern, is a fern, endemic to the West Indies and naturalized in Sri Lanka.

Synonyms
 Acrostichum sulphureum Sw.
 Ceropteris sulphurea (Sw.) Fée
 Gymnogramma sulphurea (Sw.) Desv.

References

 Maxon, 1913 In: Contr. U.S. Natl. Herb. 17: 173
 The Plant List entry
 Encyclopedia of Life entry
 Hortipedia entry
 ITIS Report entry

Pteridaceae